UCSA may refer to:
Uniform Controlled Substances Act
University of California Student Association
University of Canterbury Students' Association